All India Forward Bloc (Ramayan Singh) was a political party in India. Ramayan Singh, an All India Forward Bloc leader from Bihar, had been expelled from AIFB in 1978. In May 1979 he regrouped his followers at a meeting in Delhi and constituted a parallel AIFB. Singh's party adopted the tricolour with a tiger as their flag, identical to the flag of the Indian National Army.

In the 1982 West Bengal assembly elections, Singh's party supported the Indian National Congress. Singh's party didn't win any seats.

Sources
Bose, K., Forward Bloc, Madras: Tamil Nadu Academy of Political Science, 1988.

Defunct political parties in India
Political parties established in 1979
1979 establishments in India
Political parties with year of disestablishment missing